Jeddo is an unincorporated community in Bastrop County, Texas, United States. According to the Handbook of Texas, the community had a population of 75 in 2000. It is located within the Greater Austin metropolitan area.

History
The community was founded in 1874 when a post office was established. Five years later the community was described as a thriving village. In 1890 the population was estimated at twenty, and Jeddo had one general store. Population estimates took an unexplained rise later in the decade, with 560 reported in 1896 and 559 in 1904. But the community quickly faded to a population of twelve in 1914, then dropped from population lists until about 1933, when ten people and two businesses were reported. The post office closed in 1927. From 1939 to 2000 the population was estimated at seventy-five.

The Jeddo Cemetery was founded in 1865. It is maintained by the Jeddo Cemetery Association, current as of 2011. There are 166 marked graves in the Jeddo Cemetery, the oldest dated 1835.

Geography

Education
In 1891, the settlement had two schools, one with thirty black students and the other with twenty-nine white students. In 1919, area residents voted for a school tax and had a school building erected. In 1930, the eight-grade school had two teachers and thirty pupils. The Jeddo area is entirely served by the Smithville Independent School District, approx. 18 miles to the northeast.

References

Unincorporated communities in Bastrop County, Texas
Unincorporated communities in Texas